Lucerne Festival is one of the leading international festivals in the world of classical music and presents a series of classical music festivals based in Lucerne, Switzerland. Founded in 1938 by Ernest Ansermet and Walter Schulthess, it currently produces three festivals per year. Since 1999, Michael Haefliger has been its Executive and Artistic Director. 

Each festival features resident orchestras and soloists alongside guest performances from international ensembles and artists. The central festival takes place in summer from mid-August to mid-September and offers a widely varied range of approximately 100 concerts and related events primarily at the Lucerne Culture and Congress Centre (KKL) designed by Jean Nouvel.

History 
The festival started with the so-called "Concert de Gala" in the gardens of Richard Wagner's villa at Tribschen in 1938 conducted by Arturo Toscanini, who had formed an orchestra with members of different orchestras and soloists from around Europe. In the 1940s the Swiss Festival Orchestra (Schweizerische Festspielorchester) was founded from members of the elite Swiss orchestras, which became a central part of the festival known since 1943 as the Internationalen Musikfestwochen Luzern (IMF). 

In 2000 the Internationale Musikfestwochen Luzern (IMF) was renamed as Lucerne Festival. Each festival features resident orchestras and soloists alongside guest performances from international ensembles and artists, in 2019 including the Berlin Philharmonic, Royal Concertgebouw Orchestra, Vienna Philharmonic, Bernard Haitink, Anne-Sophie Mutter and Sir Simon Rattle. Since the 1970s the annual festivals are organized around different themes.

Organization 
Since 1970 Lucerne Festival has been legally organized as a foundation. Since 1999 the Executive and Artistic Director of Lucerne Festival has been Michael Haefliger, whose contract has been extended to 2025. 

By founding the Lucerne Festival Orchestra, which was introduced to the public for the first time in August 2003, the conductor Claudio Abbado and Michael Haefliger established a link to the very origins of Lucerne Festival in 1938. It was then, with a legendary "Concert de Gala," that Arturo Toscanini gathered celebrated virtuosos of the era together to form a unique elite orchestra. The Lucerne Festival Orchestra comprises internationally acclaimed principals, chamber musicians, and music teachers. With Riccardo Chailly, this unique orchestra once again has an Italian music director. Riccardo Chailly, who became Abbado’s successor in the summer of 2016, extended his contract until the end of 2026. 

The Lucerne Festival Academy was founded in 2003 by Pierre Boulez and Michael Haefliger. Each summer, Academy members are joined by leading internationally renowned composers and conductors to work on contemporary scores and modern classics and to perform music of the twentieth and twenty-first centuries. The composer Wolfgang Rihm has been the Artistic Director of the Academy since 2016 and his contract has been extended until 2025. In 2021 the Lucerne Festival Contemporary Orchestra (LFCO) as a new festival orchestra devoted to contemporary music was founded to bring together current and former Academy students.

Through the “Music for Future” category, Lucerne Festival shows its commitment to the generation of tomorrow: not only all those who will be performing in the future on concert stages as soloists or in the orchestra, but also the young audiences who will be listening to them: children, young people, and families.

Festivals 
Lucerne Festival organized three festivals every year until 2019. Due to the Coronavirus pandemic in 2020 all three festivals had to be cancelled; inaugural Spring Musical Weekend (with Teodor Currentzis), the Summer Festival and the weekend in fall (with Igor Levit and Patricia Kopatchinskaja). Instead, in August 2020 Lucerne Festival presented a comeback to life-music with the ten-day “Life is Live” Festival, during which the Lucerne Festival Orchestra was led by Herbert Blomstedt for the first time. 

In May 2021 the Festival communicated a new strategy and presented three new festival formats in spring and autumn. The central Summer Festival will in future be complemented in the fall by Lucerne Festival Forward which will take place in November 2021 for the first time, a new short festival with the Lucerne Festival Orchestra starting in spring 2022 and a Piano Festival with pianist Igor Levit was announced for May 2023.

Summer Festival 
The largest festival is the Summer Festival taking place in August and September and featuring over 100 events. The core of the festival are around 30 symphony concerts featuring the world’s best orchestras, conductors and soloists. Since 2003 it has been launched by the Lucerne Festival Orchestra. International stars are invited to be "artistes étoiles" and "composers-in-residence". 

The Summer Festival is organized around an annual theme; recent topics have been "Identity", "Childhood" and "Power". The theme of the 2021 Summer Festival is "crazy".

Fall Festival 
The inaugural Lucerne Festival Forward took place from 19 to 21 November 2021. Both artistically and programmatically, it was defined by members of the Lucerne Festival Contemporary Orchestra (LFCO). The Festival moreover actively involved the public in the planning process through its digital communication channels. This newly conceived Festival orchestra for the music of our time is composed of members of the international Academy network. The KKL Luzern serves as the Festival headquarters, but “Lucerne Festival Forward!” performed throughout the city, involving all age groups, and offered unusual concert formats and integrated new technologies.

Spring Festival 
Starting in 2022, the Lucerne Festival Orchestra will open the Festival year annually on the weekend before Easter, under the direction of its music director Riccardo Chailly. A Mendelssohn Festival is planned for the first two years, coupling all of the composer's symphonies with music by his contemporaries Wagner, Schubert, and Berlioz, as well as his role model Johann Sebastian Bach.

Piano Festival 
Following the great success of his Beethoven cycle at Lucerne Festival, pianist Igor Levit will curate a new piano festival. Beginning in 2023, he will present a long weekend each May in which he himself will not only perform but also introduce artist friends and ensembles from other musical genres.

Easter Festival 
The Easter Festival (Lucerne Festival zu Ostern) was founded in 1988 and took place each spring over a nine-day period two weeks before Easter and lasting until Palm Sunday, with a special focus given to sacred music. Performances were held in churches throughout Lucerne, as well as in the KKL and included annual guest performances by the Bavarian Radio Symphony Orchestra and Choir. Additionally, Bernard Haitink together with the Lucerne Festival Strings led annual master classes for young conductors. The Easter Festival was ended after the 2019 edition.

Piano Festival 
The Piano Festival was founded in 1998 and took place every November over a nine-day period. It showcased keyboard virtuosos and emerging stars in a mixture of recitals, orchestral concerts, and chamber music. The ancillary "Piano Off-Stage!" program presented a series of jazz events in a range of Lucerne's bars and restaurants. The Piano Festival was ended after the 2019 edition.

References

External links

 
Classical music festivals in Switzerland
Tourist attractions in the canton of Lucerne